Deutsch-Französisches Institut or dFi (as per homepage) is an institute offering cultural exchange between Germany and France in Erlangen, established on 1 November 2003.

dFi is the Centre Franco-Allemands in Bavaria. The institute offers language courses both in French and German and other cultural activities for francophones.

External links
 DFI Homepage (Erlangen)

Cultural organisations based in Germany
Education in Erlangen
European cultural exchange
France–Germany relations